Lutz Wahl (November 2, 1869 – December 30, 1928) was a major general in the United States Army who served as Adjutant General of the U.S. Army from 1927 to 1928.

Biography
Lutz Wahl was born in Milwaukee, Wisconsin, on November 2, 1869. He graduated from the United States Military Academy in 1891. He served with the 5th Infantry in Louisiana and Georgia, and was then assigned as Professor of Military Science at Louisiana State University. During the Spanish–American War he served with the 21st Infantry, and was later assigned to mobilize and train volunteer units from Mississippi.

After an assignment with the 15th Infantry in Plattsburgh, New York, Wahl served in the Philippines from 1899 to 1901. Assigned there during the Philippine–American War, Wahl saw action at Guadeloupe Ridge and other battles. He performed recruiting duty in Colorado and Louisiana, and then served with the 21st Infantry in Montana.

He served again in the Philippines again beginning in 1906, Colorado in 1909, and the Philippines again in 1911. He was assigned to Fort Monroe, Virginia, and then Madison Barracks, New York. He graduated from the United States Army War College in 1916, and served at Eagle Pass, Texas, during and after the Pancho Villa Expedition.

Wahl was an instructor at the War College until the start of World War I, when he took command of the 58th Infantry Regiment, which he led during mobilization and training at Gettysburg, Pennsylvania, and Camp Greene, North Carolina. He then directed operations for the Army General Staff, after which he commanded the 14th Infantry Brigade, receiving promotion to temporary brigadier general. He led the brigade from training in Texas to embarkation at Camp Merritt, New Jersey, to combat in France, arriving in time for the final offensive before the Armistice. He received the Army Distinguished Service Medal for his World War I service, with the medal's citation reading:

After the war Wahl remained in France on occupation duty. In September 1919 he took command of the 7th Infantry Division at Camp Funston. He then served on the board that appraised civilian claims against the Army for property lost and damaged during the war, reverting to the permanent rank of colonel.

He graduated from the United States Army Command and General Staff College in 1921, after which he was assigned as assistant to the Adjutant General of the Army, receiving promotion to permanent brigadier general.

From 1927 until his death Wahl served as adjutant general, receiving promotion to major general and serving until his death.

Wahl died in Washington, D.C., on December 30, 1928. He is buried in Arlington National Cemetery, Section W, Site 1628.

Wahl was married twice. His first wife was Emma Joubert (1871–1923) of New Orleans, with whom he had two children, Gretchen Marie and George Douglas. With his second wife, Fenella Hero Castanado (1891–1976), he had a daughter named Barbara and a stepdaughter named Fenella.

His son, George Douglas Wahl, was a career army officer who achieved the rank of brigadier general.

See also
 List of Adjutant Generals of the U.S. Army

References

External links
 Lutz Wahl at ArlingtonCemetery.net (an unofficial website) – posts the 1951 USMA Graduates Association Annual Report concerning Wahl
 Lutz Wahl at Military Times Hall of Valor
 Gen. Lutz Wahl Taken by Death, Spokane Spokesman-Review, January 1, 1929
 Video: Lutz Wahl Receives the Armistice News in France at the End of World War I at criticalpast.com

1869 births
1928 deaths
United States Army War College faculty
Military personnel from Wisconsin
United States Military Academy alumni
United States Army Command and General Staff College alumni
United States Army War College alumni
American military personnel of the Spanish–American War
American military personnel of the Philippine–American War
United States Army generals of World War I
United States Army generals
Adjutants general of the United States Army
Recipients of the Distinguished Service Medal (US Army)
Burials at Arlington National Cemetery